Hope Darst is an American Christian musician and songwriter. Darst made her debut in 2020 with the release of her debut studio album, Peace Be Still (2020), containing the singles "Peace Be Still" and "Promise Keeper", which debuted at number 23 on the Top Christian Albums Chart in the United States. "Peace Be Still" was Darst's breakout hit single, having peaked at number six on Billboard's Hot Christian Songs chart. In 2021, Darst garnered three nominations at the 52nd GMA Dove Awards, being nominated for New Artist of the Year, Inspirational Recorded Song of the Year for "Promise Keeper", and Worship Recorded Song of the Year for "Peace Be Still".

Career
On February 7, 2020, Hope Darst released her debut single "Peace Be Still", with Fair Trade Services announcing that they signed a record deal with her and subsequently added her to their roster. "Peace Be Still" became Darst's breakout single, debuting at number six on Billboard's Hot Christian Songs chart. Darst released her debut studio album, Peace Be Still, on August 21, 2020. Peace Be Still debuted at number 23 on the Top Christian Albums Chart. On December 26, 2020, Darst released her second single, "Promise Keeper", to Christian radio in the United States. "Promise Keeper" peaked at number 26 on the Hot Christian Songs chart. Darst received three nominations at the 2021 GMA Dove Awards, being nominated for New Artist of the Year, Worship Recorded Song of the Year for "Peace Be Still", and Inspirational Recorded Song of the Year for "Promise Keeper".

Discography

Albums

EPs

Singles

As lead artist

As featured artist

Promotional singles

Other appearances

Awards and nominations

GMA Dove Awards

!Ref.
|-
| rowspan="3" | 2021
| Hope Darst
| New Artist of the Year
| 
| rowspan="3" | 
|-
| "Promise Keeper"
| Inspirational Recorded Song of the Year
| 
|-
| "Peace Be Still"
| Worship Recorded Song of the Year
| 
|-
|}

References

External links
 

1980 births
Living people
20th-century Christians
21st-century Christians
21st-century American singers
American women singer-songwriters
American singer-songwriters
American performers of Christian music
Composers of Christian music
Christian music songwriters
Performers of contemporary worship music
21st-century American women